Thomas Rowley Hill (1 March 1816 – 9 October 1896) was an English Liberal politician who sat in the House of Commons from 1874 to 1885.

Hill was born at Stourport, the son of William Hill FRAS. He was educated at University College London. He held a number of public offices, being Sheriff of Worcester in 1858, Mayor of Worcester in 1859 and a J.P. and Deputy Lieutenant for Worcestershire.

In 1868 Hill stood unsuccessfully for parliament at Worcester. He became High Sheriff of Worcestershire in 1870. At the 1874 general election Hill was elected Member of Parliament for Worcestershire. He lost the seat in 1885 and failed to regain it when he stood in the 1886 general election. He was a member of the Worcester and Suckley school boards in 1879.

Hill was a very charitable man, and founded and endowed almshouses for four aged women in Berwick Street, Worcester. He died at the age of 80.

Hill married firstly Esther Evans, daughter of Richard Evans of Worcester in 1838. Esther died in 1839 and in 1842 he remarried to Mary Hilditch Evans, daughter of Edward Evans of Worcester.

References

External links

1816 births
1896 deaths
Liberal Party (UK) MPs for English constituencies
UK MPs 1880–1885
UK MPs 1874–1880
Alumni of University College London
Deputy Lieutenants of Worcestershire
High Sheriffs of Worcestershire
Mayors of places in Worcestershire
People from Stourport-on-Severn